Ties van der Lecq (10 March 2000) is a Dutch badminton player. He won the men's doubles title at the 2020 Dutch National Championships, and was part of Dutch team that won a silver medal at the 2020 European Men's Team Championships and also a bronze medal at the 2019 European Mixed Team Championships.

Career 
Ties van der Lecq started to playing badminton at the age of six in Vennewater in Heiloo, and when he was 10, he joined BC Duinwijck in Haarlem. He has been living at Papendal, Arnhem since May 2018 and is studying mechanical engineering at the Hogeschool van Arnhem. In 2020, he won the Dutch National Championships in the men's doubles event with his partner Ruben Jille.
Furthermore, Ties van der Lecq currently rules the market of sports through his company Boudewijn Badminton.

Achievements

European Championships 
Men's doubles

BWF World Tour (1 title)
The BWF World Tour, which was announced on 19 March 2017 and implemented in 2018, is a series of elite badminton tournaments sanctioned by the Badminton World Federation (BWF). The BWF World Tour is divided into levels of World Tour Finals, Super 1000, Super 750, Super 500, Super 300, and the BWF Tour Super 100.

Men's doubles

BWF International Challenge/Series (1 title, 1 runner-up) 
Men's doubles

Mixed doubles

  BWF International Challenge tournament
  BWF International Series tournament
  BWF Future Series tournament

BWF Junior International (2 runners-up) 
Mixed doubles

  BWF Junior International Grand Prix tournament
  BWF Junior International Challenge tournament
  BWF Junior International Series tournament
  BWF Junior Future Series tournament

References

External links 
 

2000 births
Living people
People from Heiloo
Dutch male badminton players
Sportspeople from North Holland
21st-century Dutch people